The 1984–85 Women's European Champions Cup was the 24th edition of the Europe's competition for national champions women's handball clubs, running between October 1984 and Spring 1985. Spartak Kyiv defeated defending champion Radnicki Belgrade in the final to win its tenth title.

Qualifying round

Round of 16

Quarter-finals

Semifinals

Final

References

Women's EHF Champions League
Ihf Women's European Cup, 1985-86
Ihf Women's European Cup, 1985-86
IHF
IHF